USS Winifred (ID-1319) was a cargo ship and tanker that served in the United States Navy from 1918 to 1919.

Construction
Winifred was laid down as the first steel-hulled, single-screw cargo ship SS Winifred on 31 January 1898 at Bath, Maine by Bath Iron Works. Launched on 8 July 1898, she was delivered to her managing owners, Hiller, Bull, and Knowlton of New York City, on 1 October 1898. Winfred, the first steel tramp steamer designed and built in the United States, was built to operate for the New York and Porto Rico Steamship Company.

Basic specifications as built are given as  length overall,  length L.W.L.,  registered length,  beam molded,  registered beam,  depth molded center,  loaded draft with a gross tonnage of 2,456.48. Watertight compartments were formed by six watertight bulkheads running up to the weather deck and two partial transverse bulkheads.

The ship had accommodations for up to eighteen passengers.

Service history

1898-1918
Winifred initially operated on the New York-to-Puerto Rico route. By late in 1917, Winifred was operating as a commercial oil tanker under the auspices of the Gulf Refining Company of Port Arthur, Texas. In the autumn of 1917, with the participation of the United States in World War I well underway, she was armed, and on 17 October 1917, a U.S. Navy Naval Armed Guard unit under the command of Chief Boatswain's Mate W. A. Moon was placed aboard her. After docking at Bayonne, New Jersey, to take on a cargo of oil, Winifred shifted to Hampton Roads, Virginia, where she joined a convoy. Departing Hampton Roads on 8 November 1917, she reached Dover, England on 29 November 1917 and Gravesend, Kent on 30 November 1917. She remained in British waters for the remainder of 1917, touching at Sheerness in England, Cardiff in Wales, and Dover. Winifred operated in European waters into the summer of 1918.

1918-1919
The U.S. Navy acquired Winifred for World War I service on 21 June 1918 while she was in drydock at Liverpool, England. Assigned naval registry Identification Number (Id. No.) 1319, she was commissioned as USS Winifred the same day.

Assigned to the Naval Overseas Transportation Service and operating primarily from Cardiff, Winifred performed coastwise service in British waters and service across the English Channel, lifting supplies from English to French ports and vice versa, through the end of World War I.

Winifred departed Liverpool on 12 December 1918 and proceeded to the United States via the Azores, arriving at New York City on 8 January 1919. Shifting to Philadelphia, Pennsylvania soon thereafter, she was decommissioned there on 13 March 1919. Simultaneously struck from the Naval Vessel Register, she was turned over to the United States Shipping Board on the same day for disposal.

1919-1936
Winifred was returned to the Gulf Refining Company. Once again SS Winifred, she operated from her home port of Port Arthur, Texas until 1936, when she was abandoned due to age and deterioration.

Footnotes

References

Department of the Navy: Naval Historical Center Online Library of Selected Images:  Civilian Ships: Winifred (American Freighter & Oil Tanker, 1898). Served as USS Winifred (ID # 1319) in 1918-1919
NavSource Online: Section Patrol Craft Photo Archive: Winifred (ID 1319)

World War I cargo ships of the United States
World War I tankers of the United States
Ships built in Bath, Maine
1898 ships
Cargo ships of the United States Navy
Unique oilers and tankers of the United States Navy